is a Japanese manga series written and illustrated by Ryuhei Tamura. It is the story about a first year student at a school for juvenile delinquents. It was first published in 2008 as a one-shot in Shueisha's Weekly Shōnen Jump, subsequently winning the fourth Gold Future Cup. The manga was then serialized in the same magazine, from February 2009 to February 2014, and then transferred to Jump Next!! as Beelzebub Another, where it ran from May 2014 to March 2015.

The Pierrot+ studio produced an original video animation (OVA) adaptation, which premiered at the Jump Super Anime Tour in October 2010. This was followed by a 60-episode anime television series, which aired in Japan between January 2011 and March 2012.

Plot

The story follows Tatsumi Oga, who is a first year student at a school for juvenile delinquents called Ishiyama High. The story starts with Oga telling his best friend, Takayuki Furuichi, the strange story of how he found a baby. One day while doing 'laundry' by the river, he saw a man floating downstream. Oga pulled him to shore but the man split in half, revealing a baby boy inside. This baby turned out to be the son of the great demon king, and Oga has been chosen as the one to raise him, along with the baby's maid, Hilda. The manga follows Oga's life as he tries to raise the child while enrolled at Ishiyama High.

In the early chapters, he attempts to 'pass on' Beel to other students at Ishiyama, thinking that if he can find someone stronger and more evil than himself, the baby will attach himself to that person instead. He decides to try to pass the baby on to the Tōhōshinki, Ishiyama High's strongest four students. Oga meets and fights Hajime Kanzaki, the first member of the Touhoushinki and the one who is closest to dominating the school; however, Oga defeats Kanzaki, which causes Beel to find him even more appealing.

Later, Oga then discovers a peculiar symbol etched on the back of his right hand. Hilda explains that it is the fly king's seal, more commonly known as the Zebul spell, and serves as the family crest of the royal family. The appearance of the seal means that he has officially made a contract with Beel. She also explains that the more evil the bearer of the seal is, the more complex the design of the seal will become. Oga attempts to prevent the seal from growing by avoiding fights with other students, but gives up when Himekawa, the second member of the Touhoushinki, captures Hilda and Furuichi. Oga then infiltrates Himekawa's base to rescue them and defeats him by using the Zebul blast for the first time. The consequences of using the seal's power cause the crest to stretch across his arm. Hilda comments after looking at the crest that the amount of energy it used would have driven a normal human mad.

While visiting the park, Oga then meets a girl named Aoi and her brother, Kouta. Oga asks her immediately to go out with him, which causes a misunderstanding that stays within Aoi's heart. Oga tells Beel to fight Kouta, possibly as a joke, but Kouta accepts the challenge and easily pushes Beel off a bench. This event sparks a rivalry between the two babies. It is later revealed that Aoi, who was in disguise the whole time, is in fact Aoi Kunieda, then, the leader of the Red Tails and another member of the Touhoushinki.

Aoi, who was then away from school during the earlier events of the manga, has returned to Ishiyama High to defeat Oga in order to prevent him from causing any more trouble within the school. When they encounter each other in battle, she realizes that she has already met Oga in the park, but he doesn't recognize her. After he dodges her attacks twice, he notices Beel's interest in Aoi and asks her to become Beel's mother. Although he means for her to replace him as a parent, his request causes another misunderstanding similar to the one in the park. The fight is postponed, and Hilda soon arrives to give Beel his milk. The MK5 make their debut in the story, only to be defeated in a five panel pattern which appears again later in the story. After the fight, Beel senses something which turns out to be the last of the Toushinki, Tojo. Oga, however, does not notice.

Aoi sees Oga and Hilda's fight with the MK5, and believes the rumors that they are husband and wife. She is challenged by Hilda to a fight so she can test her ability, but the fight ends quickly with Hilda deciding that Aoi isn't on the same level as Oga. At the same time, Oga is confronted by Chiaki and Nene. Two female students tell Aoi that Oga injured the two of them, which later turns out to be MK5.

Aoi fights Oga to avenge her two classmates, while Oga assumes that she wants to accept the role of becoming Beel's parent. At the same time, Nene wakes up in the infirmary and goes to warn Aoi of MK5's trap, which turns out to be Miwa's scheme. MK5, however, prevents anyone from interrupting Aoi and Oga's fight. Nene is about to get shot, but Natsume appears and fights with MK5 to allow Nene to tell Aoi. She was unfortunately too late, as Aoi seems to have defeated Oga, and she comes just in time for Miwa and Ikari to take over.

Oga suddenly gets back up and defeats Ikari and Miwa with ease. It is then shown that Furuichi and Hilda have been watching the whole time. Oga, Furuichi, Hilda and baby Beel go to the beach in search of Tojo to hand baby Beel over to him, not knowing that this is a plot set up by Kanzaki and Himekawa, who want Tojo and Oga to crush each other. Aoi goes to the beach as well to warn Oga of Tojo's strength. Oga and the gang have troubles searching for Tojo and are sent on a wild goose chase. Oga decides to write a letter of challenge to Tojo and have Aoi pass it to him. Aoi attempts to tear it up, but one of Tojo's henchmen finds it. They are supposed to meet between the two rocks at 5 PM. Oga is confronted by the MK5 once again, but quickly defeats them and arrives late. Tojo has left after crushing several motorcycle gangs, which inspires Oga to find Tojo. Later, baby Beel starts feeling sick and it appears that he's come down with a cold. However, Oga's tattoo mysteriously vanishes, and later that night Beel disappears. Hilda kicks Oga out of the house and leaves to find help in the demon world. Oga goes off to find Beel, but runs into Tojou, who, as it turns out, has Beel on his back. After a scuffle, Tojo comes out as the victor, and asks Oga to challenge him again sometime. Once Oga gets home, he is in a surprise to find Hilda there waiting for him, with a strange demon doctor known as Dr. Furucas, and his assistant, Lamia. Furucas reveals that the cold is actually Beel's way of coping with a rise of his power, by keeping the energy within himself, and that he cut off the link between him and Oga to protect him. Lamia then injects Oga with a drug that allows him to re-establish the connection with Beel. Oga then goes to confront Tojo with the aid of the three other Tohoshinki. Once he makes it to Tojo, Beel returns to normal and goes back to Oga. Tojo and Oga then have one final duel in which Oga is victorious, but baby Beel's influx of power causes him to destroy Ishiyama.

Due to their school being destroyed, the students of Ishiyama can only go to their sister school, Saint Ishiyama. Initially, they are constantly looked down on, but after a volleyball match against the Six Knights, the negative views towards them stop. During the volleyball match, Oga's demonic power is displayed due to a fight with someone who had a grudge on him, though it is covered up by the Saint Ishiyama president who claimed that it is just a trick. The president turned out to be a demon himself.

A new teacher soon arrives to replace the one teaching the Ishiyama group, knocking out both Oga and Tojo on the same day before carrying them to the classroom. The teacher, Zenjiro Saotome, later appears when Oga, Hilda and Aoi are attacked by Hecadoth, and puts up a fight against the demon. Later, Naga and Graphel, the other two demons who came to the world in search of Oga, appear before Saotome, but Saotome uses his Spellmaster spell to attack them. After realizing that he is a Spellmaster who is too powerful for them to win against, Naga uses a teleporting jewel to take the three demons back to Demon World. After that, Saotome, the spellmaster, although having Oga refuse, ends up training him. After successfully powering up, Oga confronts the demons and defeats them. He later battles with other human-demon contractors and is brutally defeated before eventually gaining more strength and defeating the strongest contractor. The last chapter displays him returning from an adventure to the demon world with another baby on his shoulder.

Media

Manga

Beelzebub, written and illustrated by Ryuhei Tamura, was first published as one-shot pilot chapter in Shueisha's shōnen manga magazine Weekly Shōnen Jump on August 11, 2008, subsequently winning the fourth Gold Future Cup. It was later serialized for five years in the same magazine from February 23, 2009, to February 24, 2014. A spin-off series, entitled , ran in Shōnen Jump Next!! from May 7, 2014, to March 13, 2015. Shueisha collected its 246 chapters in twenty-eight tankōbon volumes, released from July 2, 2009, to May 1, 2015.

Anime

An anime adaptation has been produced by Pierrot Plus. An original video animation was shown during the Jump Super Anime Tour between October 23 and November 21, 2010. The TV anime premiered on January 9, 2011, on Yomiuri TV and other NNS stations and ended on March 25, 2012. The series' cast included Katsuyuki Konishi as Oga, Miyuki Sawashiro, Shizuka Itou, Aki Toyosaki, Tomokazu Seki, and Takahiro Mizushima. Crunchyroll simulcasted the series in North America and Europe two hours after airing. However, some episodes were postponed and rescheduled following the 2011 Tōhoku earthquake and tsunami. The series ended on March 25, 2012, with a total of 60 episodes. The series airs with English subtitles on Animax Asia in Southeast Asia, although it is edited to cover Baby Beel's nudity with a diaper. The series has been licensed in North America by Discotek Media in 2015. Muse Communication has licensed the series in Asia-Pacific and streamed on Muse Asia YouTube channel.

Music
Opening themes
 by Hiroaki Takeuchi (OVA)
 by Group Tamashii (Eps 1–10), and used in the final episode (Eps 60) ending
 by On/Off (Eps 11–23)
"Hey!!!" by Flow (Eps 24–35)
"Baby U" by MBLAQ (Eps 36–48)
 by Lc5 (Eps 49–60)
Ending themes
"Answer" by no3b (Episodes 1–10)
 by Shoko Nakagawa (Eps 11–23)
 by Tomato n'Pine (Eps 24–35)
 by Nozomi Sasaki (Eps 36–48)
 by 9nine (Eps 49–59)

Video games
Oga appears as a playable character, assisted by Baby Beel, in the Jump crossover fighting game J-Stars Victory VS. Aoi, Hilda, and Alaindelon appear in the game's story mode as non-playable characters.

Notes

References

External links
 Official Anime Website 
 

2009 manga
2008 manga
2010 anime OVAs
2011 anime television series debuts
Action anime and manga
Anime series based on manga
Comedy anime and manga
Demons in anime and manga
Discotek Media
Manga adapted into television series
Muse Communication
Studio Signpost
Shōnen manga
Shueisha manga
Shueisha franchises
Supernatural anime and manga
Yomiuri Telecasting Corporation original programming